IL-24 or IL 24 can refer to:
 Interleukin 24
 Illinois's 24th congressional district, an obsolete district
 Illinois Route 24
 Ilyushin-24 Soviet bomber project. The design of the plane based on IL-22 was started after World War II and abandoned along with the IL-22 project.